Herbert Frank York (24 November 1921 – 19 May 2009) was an American nuclear physicist. He held numerous research and administrative positions at various United States government and educational institutes.

Biography

York was born in Rochester, New York where he received his B.S. and M.S. degress, both in 1943, from the University of Rochester, and then went on to obtain his Ph.D. from the University of California, Berkeley in 1949. During World War II he was a physicist at the Berkeley Radiation Laboratory and at Oak Ridge National Laboratory as part of the Manhattan Project. He was the first director of Lawrence Livermore National Laboratory from 1952 to 1958. After leaving the laboratory in 1958, he held numerous positions in both government and academia, including the first Chief Scientist of the Advanced Research Projects Agency, and the first Director of Defense Research and Engineering.

York was a professor of physics at the University of California, Berkeley. He was the founding Chancellor of the University of California San Diego (1961–1964, 1970–1972). He later served as U.S. ambassador to the Comprehensive Test Ban negotiations in Geneva, Switzerland (1979–1981).

York was Director Emeritus of the Institute on Global Conflict and Cooperation at UC San Diego and served as chairman of the university's Scientific and Academic Advisory Committee, which oversees activities at both Livermore and Los Alamos National Laboratories. He also served on the board of the Council for a Livable World, a nonpartisan arms control organization in Washington, D.C. York occasionally guest lectured for UC San Diego and other institutions.

Herbert York died 19 May 2009 in San Diego at age 87.

Publications
Race to Oblivion (Simon & Schuster, 1970)
Arms Control (Readings from Scientific American (W.H. Freeman, 1973)
The Advisors: Oppenheimer, Teller and the Superbomb (W.H. Freeman, 1976), a book that Hans Bethe regarded as containing a highly accurate treatment of the "Russian H-bomb" test of 1953.

Making Weapons, Talking Peace: A Physicist's Journey from Hiroshima to Geneva (Harper & Row, 1987)
A Shield in Space? Technology, Politics and the Strategic Defense Initiative (U.C. Press, 1988, with Sanford Lakoff)
Arms and the Physicist (American Physical Society, 1994)

References

External links
Annotated Bibliography for Herbert York from the Alsos Digital Library for Nuclear Issues
Interview: Conversations with History: Reminiscences from a Career in Science, National Security, and the University, with Herbert F. York 
Herbert F. York Papers MSS 107. Special Collections & Archives, UC San Diego Library.

1921 births
2009 deaths
American nuclear physicists
Chancellors of the University of California, San Diego
Enrico Fermi Award recipients
Manhattan Project people
Oak Ridge National Laboratory people
Lawrence Livermore National Laboratory staff
United States Department of Defense officials
University of Rochester alumni
University of California, Berkeley alumni
University of California, Berkeley faculty
People from Rochester, New York
Vannevar Bush Award recipients
Scientists from New York (state)